The 2014–15 Murray State Racers men's basketball team represented Murray State University during the 2014–15 NCAA Division I men's basketball season. The Racers, led by fourth year head coach Steve Prohm, played their home games at the CFSB Center and were members of the West Division of the Ohio Valley Conference. They finished the season 29–6, 16–0 in OVC play to win the West Division championship and the overall OVC regular season championship. After a 2–4 start, the Racers won 25 games in a row before losing in the championship game of the OVC tournament to Belmont. As a regular season champion who failed to win their conference tournament, they received an automatic bid to the National Invitation Tournament where they defeated UTEP in the first round and Tulsa in the second round before losing in the quarterfinals to Old Dominion.

On June 8, head coach Steve Prohm resigned to take the same position at Iowa State. He finished at Murray State with a record of 104–29 in four seasons.

Roster

Schedule

|-
!colspan=9 style="background:#000033; color:#ECAC00;"| Exhibition

|-
!colspan=9 style="background:#000033; color:#ECAC00;"| Regular season

|-
!colspan=9 style="background:#000033; color:#ECAC00;"|Ohio Valley tournament

|-
!colspan=9 style="background:#000033; color:#ECAC00;"|NIT

References

Murray State Racers men's basketball seasons
Murray State
Murray State